Willard Avenue was a South Shore Line flag stop located at the corner of Willard Avenue and 10th Street in Michigan City, Indiana. The station opened prior to 1937 and closed on July 5, 1994, as part of an NICTD service revision which also saw the closure of Ambridge, Kemil Road, LaLumiere, Rolling Prairie, and New Carlisle.

References

Former South Shore Line stations
Former railway stations in Indiana
Michigan City, Indiana
Railway stations in LaPorte County, Indiana
Street running
Railway stations closed in 1994